The 2001 UCI Track Cycling World Cup Classics is a multi race tournament over a season of track cycling. The season ran from 25 May 2001 to 26 August 2001. The World Cup is organised by the UCI.

Results

Men

Women

References
Round 1, Cali (Archived on June 10, 2009; results archived on June 9, 2010)
Round 2, Szczecin (Results archived on June 9, 2010)
Round 3, Pordenone (Results archived on June 9, 2010)
Round 4, Mexico (Results archived on June 9, 2010)
Round 5, Ipoh (Results archived on June 9, 2010)

World Cup Classics
UCI Track Cycling World Cup